John "Joe" Mears (20 January 1905 – 30 June 1966) was chairman of Chelsea Football Club and the Football Association.

Mears was the son and nephew of Chelsea F.C. founders, Joseph and Gus Mears respectively. He was a goalkeeper for the Old Malvernians before joining the Chelsea board in 1931, in doing so becoming the youngest director (aged 26) in the Football League. He became Chelsea chairman in 1940 following the death of Colonel Crisp. Mears was a Royal Marine during the Second World War, and his duties included the security arrangements for Prime Minister Winston Churchill's bunker.

Mears' tenure as chairman of Chelsea saw them win their first First Division title in 1954–55, and it was he who subsequently gave in to pressure from the Football League for the club not to take its place in the inaugural European Champions Cup the following season. He later managed the representative London XI side during its 1955–58 Inter-Cities Fairs Cup campaign; the team reached the final, losing on aggregate to FC Barcelona. His son Brian was also a chairman of the club.

Mears became chairman of the Football Association in 1963. As such, he was a key figure during England's preparations to host the 1966 World Cup, and was involved in the furore when the Jules Rimet trophy was stolen. It was he who received the ransom note from the thief, and was subsequently involved in the trophy's recovery.

He died of a heart attack in Oslo on 30 June 1966, two weeks before the World Cup began.

References

1905 births
1966 deaths
Chelsea F.C. chairmen and investors
Chairmen of the Football Association
English football chairmen and investors
English footballers
People educated at Malvern College
Royal Marines personnel of World War II
Old Malvernians F.C. players
Association football goalkeepers
20th-century English businesspeople